Mission: Impossible 2 (stylized as M:I-2) is a 2000 action spy film directed by John Woo and produced by and starring Tom Cruise. It is the sequel to Mission: Impossible (1996) and the second installment in the Mission: Impossible film series. The film also stars Dougray Scott, Thandiwe Newton, Richard Roxburgh, John Polson, Brendan Gleeson, Rade Šerbedžija, and Ving Rhames. In Mission: Impossible 2, Ethan Hunt (Cruise) teams with professional thief Nyah Nordoff-Hall (Newton) to find but not destroy a genetically modified disease held by rogue Impossible Missions Force (IMF) agent Sean Ambrose (Scott), who is Nordoff-Hall's former lover.

Mission: Impossible 2 was theatrically released in the United States by Paramount Pictures on May 24, 2000, and grossed $546 million worldwide, becoming the highest-grossing film of that year. Initial reaction from critics was mixed, with praise for the action sequences and Woo's direction but some criticism for the characterization. The sequel, Mission: Impossible III, was released in 2006.

Plot

Dr. Vladimir Nekhorvich, a bio-genetics scientist, sends a message to the IMF for Dmitri (Ethan Hunt's cover name), his old friend. He warns that his employer, Biocyte Pharmaceuticals, forced him to develop a biological weapon to profit from the cure. He injects himself with the Chimera virus and carries its remedy Bellerophon in a bag. However, IMF agent Sean Ambrose, who was disguised as Dmitri, goes rogue, betrays Nekhorvich, and steals Bellerophon.

IMF director Swanbeck informs Ethan about Ambrose's wrongdoings and tasks him with recovering the virus and its cure. He has him recruit Nyah Nordoff-Hall, a professional thief presently operating in Seville, Spain—and Ambrose's ex-girlfriend. Despite her initial reluctance, Ethan gets her to trace Ambrose to Sydney, Australia, where Biocyte laboratories are located. Ethan assembles his team, computer hacker Luther Stickell and pilot Billy Baird, and heads to Sydney while Nyah rekindles her relationship with Ambrose. Ambrose meets with Biocyte's CEO, John McCloy, and shows him a video of Chimera infecting one of Nekhorvich's colleagues before blackmailing McCloy into cooperating with him. 

Nyah steals the memory card the video is stored on and delivers it to Ethan. They learn that Chimera has a 20-hour dormant period before symptoms shows, and Bellerophon can only save the victim if used within that window. When Nyah discreetly returns the memory card, Ambrose notices her mistakenly placing it in the wrong pocket of his jacket. Ethan's team kidnaps McCloy for information and discover that the only Bellerophon samples were taken by Nekhorvich and are now in Ambrose's hands. However, Ambrose does not have the virus, as he was not aware that Nekhorvich injected himself with it. Ethan plans to break into Biocyte headquarters to destroy the virus, but Ambrose, posing as Ethan, tricks Nyah into revealing their plan, and is one step ahead. 

Ethan destroys all, but one sample of Chimera before Ambrose's team engages him in a firefight. At a stalemate, Ambrose orders Nyah to retrieve the virus, but she injects herself with it instead and begs Ethan to kill her to destroy the virus. Ethan refuses and is forced to leave her behind as he flees the facility, promising to get her the cure. Ambrose releases Nyah to wander the streets of Sydney, intending to start a pandemic. He offers to sell Bellerophon to McCloy in exchange for stock options to make him billions as Biocyte's majority shareholder. Ethan infiltrates the meeting, tricks Ambrose into killing his own henchman, and steals the remaining samples of Bellerophon. While he is pursued by Ambrose's men, Luther and Billy locate Nyah, who has wandered to a cliffside to kill herself and prevent an outbreak. 

Ethan kills Ambrose's men and beats Ambrose in a brutal fistfight on a beach. With little time left on the 20-hour countdown, Luther reaches Ethan at the beach. Ambrose tries one last time to shoot Ethan, but Ethan throws the cure to Luther and dodges away before kicking up a pistol from the sand and fatally shooting Ambrose. Luther injects Nyah with the Bellerophon just in time. The IMF clears Nyah's criminal record and Ethan starts a vacation with her in Sydney.

Cast

 Tom Cruise as Ethan Hunt, an agent of the Impossible Missions Force (IMF)
 Dougray Scott as Sean Ambrose, a rogue IMF agent who possesses Bellerophon
 Thandiwe Newton (credited as Thandie Newton) as Nyah Nordoff-Hall, a professional thief brought on to assist Ethan in tracing Ambrose
 Richard Roxburgh as Hugh Stamp, Ambrose's right-hand man.
 John Polson as Billy Baird, a helicopter pilot
 Brendan Gleeson as John C. McCloy, CEO of Biocyte at Australia.
 Rade Šerbedžija as Dr. Vladimir Nekhorvich, creator of Chimera at Biocyte

 Ving Rhames as Luther Stickell, a computer hacker and IMF agent.

Additionally, Anthony Hopkins appears in an uncredited cameo appearance as Mission Commander Swanbeck.

Production
According to screenwriter Robert Towne, several action sequences were already planned for the film prior to his involvement and before the story had been written. Ian McKellen was offered the part of Mission Commander Swanbeck but turned it down.

The studio expressed concern about the safety of filming Tom Cruise's entrance scene, in which he is free solo climbing at Dead Horse Point State Park in Moab, Utah. Cruise refused to drop the idea because he could not think of a better way to reintroduce the character. There was no safety net as he filmed the sequence, but he did have a harness and a thin wire. He tore his shoulder when performing the jump from one part of the cliff to another.

Thandiwe Newton discussed her unpleasant on-set experiences with Cruise during the shooting of the balcony sequence in a 2020 interview. According to Newton, Cruise was heavily stressed over the expectations of the sequel being good and was upset during the shooting of said scene because she had "the shittiest lines". The two decided to reverse roleplay each other as practice. However, it was unhelpful for her and pushed her "into a place of terror and insecurity". After the shooting was finished for the day, she contacted Jonathan Demme, telling him what happened. Looking back on that day, Newton said about Cruise, "Bless him. And I really do mean bless him because he was trying his damnedest."

Music

The film's original score was composed and conducted by Hans Zimmer and features vocals performed by Lisa Gerrard. In addition, the film includes contemporary music such as Limp Bizkit's rendition of Lalo Schifrin's Mission: Impossible theme entitled "Take a Look Around" as well as Metallica's "I Disappear".

While Ethan is rock climbing during his holiday, Zap Mama's remixed version of "Iko Iko" plays on the soundtrack.

Release

Home media
Mission: Impossible 2 was released on VHS and DVD on November 7, 2000, with a rare Japanese LaserDisc release following on April 3, 2001 (released late in the format's life), with a potential North American release of this LaserDisc being cancelled in mid-2001. A Blu-ray release followed on June 3, 2008, and an Ultra HD Blu-ray version was released on June 26, 2018.

Reception

Box office
On opening day, Mission: Impossible 2 made $12.5 million, making it the fourth-highest Wednesday opening, behind Men in Black, Independence Day and Star Wars: Episode I – The Phantom Menace. At that time, it had the largest number of screenings, playing at 3,653 theaters and beating Scream 3. The film would go on to hold this record until it was surpassed by Harry Potter and the Sorcerer's Stone the following year. It grossed $57,845,297, crossing over Toy Story 2 to have the third-highest opening weekend of all time, behind The Lost World: Jurassic Park and The Phantom Menace. Moreover, the film surpassed its predecessor Mission: Impossible for not only having the highest opening weekend for a film based on a TV show, but also the largest opening weekend for any Paramount film. It also dethroned Austin Powers: The Spy Who Shagged Me for scoring the biggest opening weekend for a spy film. The latter record would be held until 2002 when it was given to Austin Powers in Goldmember. Three years later in 2005, War of the Worlds surpassed Mission: Impossible 2 for having the highest opening weekend for a Paramount film. Then in 2007, The Simpsons Movie took the record for having the biggest opening weekend for a film based on a TV show. As for Mission: Impossible 2, it earned $91.8 million in its first six days, becoming the second largest Memorial Day opening weekend, just after The Lost World: Jurassic Park.

When Mission: Impossible 2 first opened, the film was ranked number one at the box office, topping out Dinosaur. It held on to the number one spot for two weekends until it was overtaken by Gone in 60 Seconds. Around this time, the film went on to become the highest-grossing film of the year domestically, beating Gladiator. It would remain so until that December when it was dethroned by How the Grinch Stole Christmas. The film eventually grossed $215,409,889 in its North American release and $330,978,216 in other territories, totaling $546,388,105 worldwide, the highest-grossing film of 2000. It is John Woo's highest-grossing film of all time, surpassing Face/Off, and was the highest-grossing film in the Mission: Impossible series until the release of the fourth film, Mission: Impossible – Ghost Protocol, in 2011.

Critical response
Review aggregation website Rotten Tomatoes indicates Mission: Impossible 2 has an overall approval rating of 56% based on 154 reviews, with an average rating of 5.9/10. The site's critical consensus reads, "Your cranium may crave more substance, but your eyes will feast on the amazing action sequences." Metacritic assigned the film a weighted average score of 59 out of 100, based on 40 critics, indicating "mixed or average reviews". Audiences polled by CinemaScore gave the film an average grade of "B" on an A+ to F scale, down from the first film's "B+".

Roger Ebert of the Chicago Sun-Times awarded the film three stars, stating "if the first movie was entertaining as sound, fury, and movement, this one is more evolved, more confident, more sure-footed in the way it marries minimal character development to seamless action." Owen Gleiberman of Entertainment Weekly felt the film was a "throwaway pleasure" but also "a triumph of souped-up action." Ella Taylor of LA Weekly said that "every car chase, every plane crash, every potential drop off a cliff is a masterpiece of grace and surprise." Desson Howe of The Washington Post said that "[John] Woo [...] takes complete command of the latest technology to create brilliant action sequences." Lou Lumenick of the New York Post said, "Check your brains at the popcorn stand and hang on for a spectacular ride."

J. Hoberman of The Village Voice called the film "a vaguely absurd thriller filled with elaborately superfluous setups and shamelessly stale James Bond riffs." Dennis Harvey of Variety said the film is "even more empty a luxury vehicle than its predecessor" and that it "pushes the envelope in terms of just how much flashy packaging an audience will buy when there's absolutely nada inside." Jonathan Rosenbaum of the Chicago Reader said that "no hero or villain winds up carrying any moral weight at all."

In a retrospective commentary in 2012, Brad Brevet noted the film has significant similarities in plot and themes to Alfred Hitchcock's 1946 film Notorious.

Mission: Impossible 2 was nominated for two Golden Raspberry Awards at the 2000 ceremony, including Worst Remake or Sequel and Worst Supporting Actress for Thandie Newton. It was also nominated for a Stinker Award at the 2000 ceremony for Worst Song (Limp Bizkit's "Take a Look Around").

A comedy short titled Mission: Improbable was shown during the 2000 MTV Movie Awards. It is a mockumentary of the behind-the-scenes stunts of Mission: Impossible 2, and stars Cruise, Ben Stiller, and Woo.

References

External links

 
 
 
 
 
 
 

Mission: Impossible (film series)
2000 films
2000 action thriller films
2000s spy action films
2000s American films
American sequel films
American spy action films
American action adventure films
American action thriller films
German sequel films
German spy action films
German action adventure films
German action thriller films
2000s English-language films
Films scored by Hans Zimmer
Films about terrorism
Films based on television series
Films directed by John Woo
Films produced by Tom Cruise
Films set in Spain
Films set in Australia
Films shot in Australia
Films set in Sydney
Films shot in Sydney
Films shot in Utah
Films with screenplays by Brannon Braga
Films with screenplays by Ronald D. Moore
Films with screenplays by Robert Towne
Cruise/Wagner Productions films
Paramount Pictures films
Weapons of mass destruction in fiction
2000s German films